The 1976–77 Cleveland Cavaliers season was the seventh season of the franchise in the National Basketball Association (NBA).

Draft picks

Roster

Season standings

Notes
 z, y – division champions
 x – clinched playoff spot

Record vs. opponents

Season standings

Record vs. opponents

Game log

|-style="background:#fcc;"
| 9 || November 7, 1976 || @ Atlanta
| L 97–107
|
|
|
| The Omni2,750
| 8–1

|-style="background:#fcc;"
| 25 || December 11, 1976 || Atlanta
| L 94–95
|
|
|
| Coliseum at Richfield12,739
| 16–9

|-style="background:#cfc;"
| 64 || March 13, 1977 || @ Atlanta
| W 115–113
|
|
|
| The Omni6,667
| 34–30
|-style="background:#cfc;"
| 73 || March 26, 1977 || Atlanta
| W 99–94
|
|
|
| Coliseum at Richfield12,344
| 39–34

Playoffs

|- align="center" bgcolor="#ffcccc"
| 1
| April 13
| @ Washington
| L 100–109
| Foots Walker (20)
| Jim Brewer (12)
| Gary Brokaw (5)
| Capital Centre11,240
| 0–1
|- align="center" bgcolor="#ccffcc"
| 2
| April 15
| Washington
| W 91–83
| Campy Russell (22)
| Jim Chones (12)
| Foots Walker (6)
| Richfield Coliseum19,545
| 1–1
|- align="center" bgcolor="#ffcccc"
| 3
| April 17
| @ Washington
| L 98–104
| Elmore Smith (20)
| Jim Brewer (13)
| Foots Walker (11)
| Capital Centre10,488
| 1–2
|-

Awards and records
 Jim Brewer, NBA All-Defensive Second Team

References

Cleveland Cavaliers seasons
Cleveland
Cleveland
Cleveland